Bitino or Bittino da Faenza (1357–1427) was an Italian painter, active in Rimini during the late 14th and early 15th century. Among his only works is a polyptych (1409) about episodes of the Life of St Julian found in the Church of San Giuliano Martire in Rimini.

References

14th-century Italian painters
Italian male painters
15th-century Italian painters
Quattrocento painters
1357 births
1427 deaths